The Renaissance Sword Club is a historical European martial arts group based in London, South East of England and Brittany, France. It was founded in 2013 by Rob Runacres. Its primary aim is the research and recreation of European swordsmanship of the sixteenth and seventeenth centuries, specifically those concerned with the rapier and spada da lato, as well as their companion weapons such as the dagger, cloak, buckler and rotella. Members have also pursued interests outside of the core curriculum in to staff weapons, longsword and small sword.

Curriculum
Students follow the theories and methods of the Italian and French schools of fencing as laid down by martial arts manuals of fencing instructors such as Achille Marozzo, Salvator Fabris, Giovanni dall’Agocchie and François Dancie. Though sidesword and rapier are considered as different sword forms for teaching purposes, emphasis is placed on the similarities in mechanics and theory. Lessons are instructor led with sparring elements.

Members are encouraged to enter competitions and have attended events such as Longpoint, Swordfish, The Albion Cup, The Wessex League and others.

History
The Renaissance Sword Club was founded in 2013 by Rob Runacres, formerly an instructor at the School of the Sword.

Educational provision
Members of the club lecture and provide workshops across Europe. Much of this has centred on the research on sword fighting in Early Modern France. Major work has concentrated on the anonymous 'Book of Lessons', Girolamo Cavalcabo's Treaty or Instruction for Fencing' and 'The Sword of Combat' by Francois Dancie.

Publications
 Pedro De Heredia (translated by Rob Runacres). Book of Lessons. Fallen Rook, 2017. 
 Francois Dancie (translated by Rob Runacres and Thibault Ghesquiere). The Sword of Combat or The Use of Fighting With Weapons. Lulu.com, 2014. 
 Girolamo Cavalcabo (translated by Rob Runacres). Treaty or Instruction for Fencing.

See also

Rapier
Swordsmanship
French school of fencing
Italian school of swordsmanship
Historical European martial arts

References

External links
Renaissance Sword Club home page
YouTube Channel

Historical European martial arts revival
Historical fencing
Martial arts organizations